The 1971 NFL season was the 52nd regular season of the National Football League. The Boston Patriots changed their name to New England Patriots to widen their appeal to the entire New England region after moving to their new stadium in Foxborough, Massachusetts, located between Boston and Providence, Rhode Island.

The season ended with Super Bowl VI when the Dallas Cowboys defeated the Miami Dolphins  at Tulane Stadium in New Orleans. The Pro Bowl took place on January 23, 1972, at the Los Angeles Memorial Coliseum; the NFC beat the AFC

Draft
The 1971 NFL Draft was held from January 28 to 29, 1971 at New York City's Belmont Plaza Hotel. With the first pick, the New England Patriots selected quarterback Jim Plunkett from Stanford University.

New officials
Three referees--Walt Fitzgerald, Bob Finley and George Rennix--retired following the 1970 season. Bob Frederic, Dick Jorgensen and Fred Wyant were promoted to fill those vacancies. Rich Eichhorst, a back judge in 1970, resigned to concentrate on officiating college basketball; he was replaced by Don Orr, who officiated in the league through 1995.

Major rule changes
Teams will not be charged a time out for an injured player unless the injury occurs inside the last two minutes of a half or overtime (since ).
Missed field goal attempts which cross the goal line can be run back. Previously, only those which fell short of the goal line could be returned; those which broke the plane of the goal line resulted in an automatic touchback.

Division races
Starting in 1970, and until 2002, there were three divisions (Eastern, Central and Western) in each conference.  The winners of each division, and a fourth “wild card” team based on the best non-division winner, qualified for the playoffs. The tiebreaker rules were changed to start with head-to-head competition, followed by division records, record against common opponents, and records in conference play. More tiebreakers were provided in 1971 because, in 1970, reversing just one game’s outcome would have led to a coin toss between Dallas and Detroit for the NFC wild card berth.

Teams listed with an asterisk in these tables are leaders on tiebreak

National Football Conference

American Football Conference

Final standings

Tiebreakers
New England finished ahead of N.Y. Jets in the AFC East based on better point differential in head-to-head games, 13 points.

Playoffs

Awards

Coaching changes

Offseason
Buffalo Bills: John Rauch resigned and was replaced by Harvey Johnson, who previously served as the team's interim head coach in 1968.
Cleveland Browns: Blanton Collier resigned and was replaced by Nick Skorich.
Green Bay Packers: Phil Bengtson was fired and replaced by Dan Devine.
Houston Oilers: Wally Lemm resigned and was replaced by Ed Hughes.
Los Angeles Rams: Tommy Prothro became the Rams' new head coach after George Allen left the team.
New England Patriots: John Mazur began his first full season as Patriots head coach. He replaced Clive Rush after seven games into the 1970 season due to medical reasons.
New Orleans Saints: J. D. Roberts began his first full season as Saints head coach. He replaced Tom Fears, who was fired after a 1-5-1 start in 1970.
St. Louis Cardinals: Bob Hollway replaced Charley Winner.
San Diego Chargers: Sid Gillman returned to the field after sitting out half of the 1969 season and all of the 1970 season due to poor health.
Washington Redskins: George Allen was named as Washington's head coach. Vince Lombardi was diagnosed with terminal cancer in late June before the 1970 season, dying on September 3. Offensive line coach Bill Austin served as Washington's head coach for 1970.

In-season
Denver Broncos: Lou Saban left the team after a 2–6–1 start. Offensive line coach Jerry Smith served as interim for the remaining five games.
Philadelphia Eagles: Jerry Williams was fired after three games. Ed Khayat was named as replacement.
San Diego Chargers: Sid Gillman again left the field after serving as head coach for 10 games. Harland Svare replaced Gilman.

Stadium changes
 The newly renamed New England Patriots moved from Harvard Stadium in Boston to their new home field, Schaefer Stadium in Foxborough, Massachusetts.
 The Chicago Bears moved their home games from Wrigley Field to Soldier Field.
 The Philadelphia Eagles moved their games from Franklin Field to Veterans Stadium.
 The San Francisco 49ers moved from Kezar Stadium into Candlestick Park.
 The Dallas Cowboys moved after their first two regular season home games from the Cotton Bowl to Texas Stadium.
 11 teams played their home games on artificial turf in 1971. This was up from 7 teams in the NFL in 1970. The teams were: Chicago, Cincinnati, Dallas, Houston, Miami, New England, New Orleans, Philadelphia, Pittsburgh, St. Louis and San Francisco.

Uniform changes
 The Atlanta Falcons switched their primary jerseys from black to red
 The Chicago Bears adopted a second white jersey with block numbers
 The New York Jets wore a modified white jersey in the first half of the season which did not have green stripes over the shoulders
 The Oakland Raiders switched from silver to black numbers on their white jerseys
 The San Francisco 49ers added alternate jerseys with no striping or TV numbers for hot games

Television
This was the second year under the league's four-year broadcast contracts with ABC, CBS, and NBC to televise Monday Night Football, the NFC package, and the AFC package, respectively. Frank Gifford's contract with CBS expired. He was then hired by ABC to serve as play-by-play announcer for MNF, while Keith Jackson returned to call college football for the network. Jack Whitaker and Pat Summerall replaced Gifford as hosts on The NFL Today, which was still a pre-recorded pregame show. At NBC, Al DeRogatis and Kyle Rote swapped color commentator positions, with DeRogatis joining Curt Gowdy as the network's lead broadcast team and Rote joining Jim Simpson at #2.

References

 NFL Record and Fact Book
 NFL History 1971–1980 (Last accessed December 4, 2005)
 Total Football: The Official Encyclopedia of the National Football League

1971
National Football League